"I Just Want to Be Your Everything" is a song recorded by Andy Gibb, initially released in April 1977 as the first single from his debut album Flowing Rivers. It reached number 1 on the Billboard Hot 100 for three weeks, starting on the week ending 30 July 1977, and again for the week ending 17 September 1977.  It was Gibb's first single released in the United Kingdom and United States.  His previous single, "Words and Music" was only released in Australia.  It is ranked number 26 on Billboards 55th anniversary All Time Top 100 list.

Writing and recording
"I Just Want to Be Your Everything" was written by Barry Gibb in Bermuda as well as "(Love Is) Thicker Than Water" with Andy Gibb credited as co-writer on the latter. It was recorded in October 1976; the sessions were produced mainly by Albhy Galuten and Karl Richardson and with Barry on this track and "(Love Is) Thicker than Water"; Galuten also played keyboards and piano. Eagles guitarist Joe Walsh contributed guitar on this song. The track is a fairly dramatic love song, with the singer declaring his unending passion and stating that without her, he would die.

Andy reveals, "'I Just Want to Be Your Everything' was one of the most meaningful of all form, you know". He later recalls on Barry Gibb's writing style:

"So, once we discussed it all and got the deal together, me and Barry locked ourselves in a bedroom and Barry just started writing. When Barry writes, it is very hard to collaborate with him, because he is so quick. And before I knew it he was starting to do the chorus of ['I Just Want to Be Your Everything'], and I thought, 'Wow what a hook!'. He's an expert at his craft. Within about 20 minutes, he'd written a number one record; and then we went right into another one, ['(Love Is) Thicker than Water']

Two mixes were prepared for the song, the more popular mix was released on the album & as the single version and the earlier mix was used for promotional uses. The promotional version had an additional keyboard that at times competed with the lead vocal. The drummer's high-hat count during both breakdowns was completely mixed out and Gibb's harmony vocal is more prevalent during ad-libs.

Release and Chart Success
In Billboard, the song spent a cumulative four weeks at No. 1 on the Hot 100 chart. The song first reached the top of the chart on July 30 for the first of three consecutive weeks. Then, The Emotions went to No. 1 with "Best of My Love" on August 20 for the first of four straight weeks, during which time Gibb's song remained in the top three. When the Emotions fell out of the #1 spot, "I Just Want to be your Everything" shot back to #1 for an additional week, on September 17. It then fell from #1 (replaced once again by "Best of My Love"), but went on to spend a then-record 16 weeks in the top 10 of the Billboard Hot 100. That record 16-week stay in the top 10 record would be surpassed in early in 1978, by his brothers, Barry, Robin and Maurice Gibb, performing as The Bee Gees, when their song "How Deep is Your Love" spent 17 weeks in the top 10. On Billboard's Hot 100, "I Just Want to be your Everything" ultimately enjoyed a 31-week chart run spanning from the end of April through the end of November.

In Billboard's competitor magazine Cashbox, Gibb's hit stayed at #1 for three consecutive weeks, spent 12 weeks in the top 10, and 29 weeks on the Top 100 Singles Chart.

Cash Box said that "a high-pitched, boyish voice is the vehicle for this happy love song." Record World said that "a sure pop touch should take this tune penned by brother Barry right up the charts."

On the Top Singles Chart of Record World (another Billboard competitor), "I Just Want to be your Everything" racked up a five-week stay at #1, which, like its four-week run on Billboard's Hot 100, was interrupted by the Emotions "Best of My Love." On the Record World singles chart, Gibb hit #1 on August 6, stayed there on August 13, then yielded to The Emotions for two weeks, before returning to #1 for two additional weeks beginning on September 3. Gibb's record spent 15 weeks in Record World's top 10, from mid-July to late October, and spent of a total of 32 weeks amongst the top 100 singles on Record World's Top Singles Chart.

"I Just Want to be Your Everything" was Andy Gibb's longest-running chart single in Billboard, Record World, and Cashbox.  In terms of the year-end charts of Billboard, Cashbox and Record World, all ranked "I Just Want to be your Everything" as the #2 song of 1977, bested only by Debby Boone's "You Light Up My Life." (in Cashbox and Record World) and by "Tonight's the Night" by Rod Stewart (in Billboard) Gibb's song also appeared on the Soul Singles chart, peaking at number 19 and was nominated for a Grammy Award for Best Pop Vocal Performance, Male at the 20th Grammy Awards.  The song became a gold record.

Personnel
Andy Gibb — vocals
Barry Gibb — background and harmony vocals
Joey Murcia — electric guitar
Joe Walsh — electric guitar
Paul Harris — keyboards
Albhy Galuten — synthesizer

Harold Cowart — bass
Ron Ziegler — drums
Nelson "Flaco" Padrón — percussion

Chart performance

Weekly charts

Year-end charts

All-time charts

Connie Smith's version

The best-known cover version of "I Just Want to Be Your Everything" was recorded by American country music artist Connie Smith. Released in the autumn of 1977, Smith's version, according to AMG reviewer Stephen Thomas Erlewine, was "relatively faithful" to Gibb's version and — given its disco-influenced sound — also a departure from her honky-tonk songs of the 1960s and early 1970s.

"I Just Want to Be Your Everything" peaked at #14 on Billboard Magazine's Hot Country Songs chart in 1978, becoming her last significant hit, as her further hits for Monument Records, such as "Lovin' You Baby" and "They'll Never Be Another for Me," peaked in progressively lower positions on the country chart between 1978 and 1979.

Chart performance

References

External links
 

1976 songs
1977 songs
1977 singles
Songs written by Barry Gibb
Andy Gibb songs
Connie Smith songs
Song recordings produced by Barry Gibb
Number-one singles in Australia
Billboard Hot 100 number-one singles
Cashbox number-one singles
RPM Top Singles number-one singles
RSO Records singles
Monument Records singles
British soft rock songs
Disco songs
Funk songs